The Sidi Kacem El Jellizi Mausoleum (زاوية سيدي قاسم الجليزي) is a zaouia located on the edge of the medina of Tunis in Tunisia.

Story 

Built during the second half of the 15th century on a hill overlooking the kasbah of Tunis, it was the home of Sidi Kacem El Jellizi, a Tunisian saint born into a family of Andalusian migrants who stayed in Fez before settling in Hafsid Ifriqiya. Nicknamed jellizi in reference to the craft of zellige manufacturing that he exerted with great skill, he was known for his great piety, benevolence and generosity: the place served as a refuge for travelers and traders, as well as Andalusian refugees after the capture of Granada in 1492, which increased his consideration with the Hafsid leaders and the veneration of the population. After his death in 1496, he was buried in the building, which was decorated by himself or his spiritual and artistic followers.

Subsequently, the zaouia was enlarged twice: first in the 17th century with the addition of a courtyard surrounded by rooms and then in the 18th century with the addition of the prayer room under the reign of Al-Husayn I ibn Ali.

Architecture 

The monument has a pyramidal dome covered with green tiles, with a carved wooden ceiling inside. Access to the building is through a double-leafed door topped by a lintel with finely worked keys. The interior is divided into two parts, of which one houses the burial of the saint and the other houses those of Hafsid sultans. The main façade is partially covered by faience, part of which is typical of Andalusia and Morocco.

The patio is distinguished by a paving in white marble encrusted with black marble; it is framed by porticos which each have five broken oversized arches made of stone paired with ocher shellstone. The arches rest on columns of white marble whose capitals are Hafsid or Hispano-Moorish. The hypostyle-type prayer room is divided into three naves parallel to the wall of the qibla. The whole building, including the zaouia and its outbuildings, covers a total area of almost .

Museum 

The zaouia is home to the National Center of Ceramics (inaugurated in 1992), a museum with a collection of ceramics and earthenware, both local and imported (e.g., fine examples of blue earthenware from the Ottoman Empire), but also ancient Islamic funerary steles.

Remarkable pieces include a Hafsid ceramic from the kasbah of Raqqada and examples of Qallaline craftsmanship.

References

External links 

 Brève présentation du musée de la céramique (Municipalité de Tunis)
 Visite virtuelle du mausolée Sidi Kacem El Jellizi

Religious buildings and structures in Tunis
Mausoleums in Tunisia
Museums in Tunisia
Medina of Tunis
Hafsid architecture